Trubus Gunawan (born 11 November 1980) is an Indonesian footballer who currently plays for Persewangi Banyuwangi in Liga 2 as a forward

References

Living people
Indonesian footballers
1980 births
Association football forwards
Persewangi Banyuwangi players
Deltras F.C. players
PS Mojokerto Putra players